The White Lion was an English privateer operating under a Dutch letter of marque which brought the first Africans to the English colony of Virginia in 1619, a year before the arrival of the Mayflower in New England. Though the African captives were sold as indentured servants, the event is regarded as the start of African slavery in the colonial history of the United States.

Many Native-American tribes practiced some form of slavery before the European introduction of African slavery into North America. Native Americans did not buy and sell captives in the pre-colonial era, although they sometimes exchanged enslaved individuals with other tribes in exchange for redeeming their own members. In some cases, Native American slaves were allowed to live on the fringes of Native American society until they were slowly integrated into the tribe. The word "slave" may not accurately apply to such captive people.

The first enslaved Africans in the current boundaries of the United States landed in 1526 in the expedition of Spanish explorer Lucas Vázquez de Ayllón on the South Carolina and Georgia coasts. Some escaped and are thought to have joined Native Americans, if they survived. In 1527 Estevanico, an enslaved Moor, participated in the Spanish Narváez expedition. Enslaved Africans were also part of the Spanish expedition to Florida in 1539 with Hernando de Soto, and the 1565 founding of St. Augustine, Florida.

The Africans on the White Lion were probably among the thousands who had been captured in 1618-1619 by a slave raiding force primarily consisting of African raiders, under nominal Portuguese leadership, who were at war with the Kingdom of Ndongo. These particular enslaved Africans were taken on the Portuguese slave ship São João Bautista from Luanda, Angola, capital of the Portuguese settlements in Angola. The White Lion, along with another privateer, the Treasurer, commanded by Daniel Elfrith, intercepted the São João Bautista on its way to modern-day Veracruz on the Gulf coast of New Spain (present-day Mexico). The two ships captured and divided part of the Portuguese ship's African captives, under the aegis of Dutch letters of marque from Maurice, Prince of Orange. White Lion captain John Colyn Jope sailed for the Virginia colony to sell the African captives, first landing in Point Comfort, in modern-day Hampton Roads.

As John Rolfe, secretary of the colony of Virginia, wrote to Virginia Company of London treasurer Edwin Sandys:

After being sold off the White Lion, two of the indentured servants, Isabella and Anthony, married and had a child in 1624. William Tucker, named after a Virginian planter, was the first recorded person of African ancestry born in English America.

See also

Clotilda, the last known slave ship to bring slaves to North America.
Gypsies

References

Angolan-American history
Sailing ships
Slave ships
Pre-emancipation African-American history
1619 in the Thirteen Colonies
Slavery in the British Empire
Privateer ships
First arrivals in the United States